Fly Creek Grange No. 844, also known as Fly Creek Historical Society and Museum, is a historic Grange Hall located at Fly Creek in Otsego County, New York.  It was built in 1899, is a large -story, gable-roofed, rectangular frame structure, 30 feet wide and 80 feet deep.  It is sheathed in clapboard siding and rests on a cut stone and rubble foundation. It is located within the  boundaries of the Fly Creek Historic District.

It was listed on the National Register of Historic Places in 2004.

References

External links
 Fly Creek Area Historical Society

Individually listed contributing properties to historic districts on the National Register in New York (state)
Fly Creek Area Historical Society
Grange buildings on the National Register of Historic Places in New York (state)
Cultural infrastructure completed in 1899
Historical society museums in New York (state)
Museums in Otsego County, New York
1899 establishments in New York (state)
National Register of Historic Places in Otsego County, New York